Goniothalamus tavoyensis is a species of plant in the family Annonaceae. It is native to Myanmar and Thailand. Debabarta Chatterjee, who first formally described the species, named it after a town in Myanmar that at the time was called Tavoy, but has since be renamed Dawei.

Description
It is a small tree. Its wrinkled, hairless, dark brown branches are circular in cross-section and have lenticels. Its petioles are 5-10 millimeters long. Its leathery, elliptical, hairless leaves are 10–25.5 by 3.5-6.5 centimeters with tapering tips and wedge-shaped bases. It leaves have 10-12 pairs secondary veins emanating from their midribs and their smaller veins give the leaves a granular appearance. Its solitary flowers are born on 5 millimeter-long pedicels in axillary to supra-axillary positions. The pedicels have minute lance-shaped bracts. Its 3 hairless, triangular to oval sepals are 4 millimeters long with edges that touch but are not fused. Its flowers have 6 petals in two rows of three. The thick, rust-colored, oval to lance-shaped outer petals are 8 by 4 millimeters with tapering tips. The thick inner petals have edges that are fused at their apex to form a cone. Its flowers have numerous short stamen that lack filaments. The stamen's anthers are 1.5 millimeters long and the connective tissue between the anther lobes extends up to form a 1.5 millimeters-long tapering cap. Its flowers have 7-10 hairless, narrow cylindrical carpels and rounded stigmas. Its hairless, elliptical fruit are 1.4-1.8 by 0.7-1 centimeters and occur in groups of 4–8. The fruit have hard pointed tips, tapering bases with persistent calyx. The fruit are born on 9-15 millimeters-long pedicels.  The fruit are attached to the pedicels by 2-3 millimeters-long stipes.

Reproductive biology
The pollen of G. tavoyensis is shed as permanent tetrads.

Habitat and distribution
It has been observed growing in evergreen forests at elevation of 0 to 1000 meters.

References

tavoyensis
Flora of Myanmar
Flora of Thailand
Taxa named by Debabarta Chatterjee
Plants described in 1940